Antoine IX Geneviève Héraclius Agénor de Gramont (17 July 1789 – 3 March 1855), 9th Duke of Gramont, Duke of Guiche, Prince of Bidache, etc. was a 19th-century French aristocratic Army general and courtier.

Life
De Gramont was born at Versailles, the only son of Antoine, 8th Duke of Gramont by his wife Aglaé, daughter of Gabrielle de Polastron, duchesse de Polignac, a court favourite of Queen Marie-Antoinette.

When the French Revolution broke out, in the year of his birth, the De Gramont family left France for various parts of Europe: including Britain, Italy, Austria as well as Russia.

Héraclius de Gramont joined his father in Mittau, who was serving with Louis XVIII, before being commissioned at the age of nine in the Tauride Grenadier Regiment. Following basic training he was promoted Lieutenant and fought under the Russian General Suvorov's command.

Accorded the courtesy title of duc de Guiche 1813, he returned to England to complete his education before serving under the Duke of Wellington later in the Peninsular Wars. After the fall of Napoleon, his military career continued to prosper and he was appointed Lieutenant-General in the French Army in 1823 and, in 1830, later accompanied King Charles X to exile in Scotland.

Heraclius de Gramont married Ida, comtesse d'Orsay (sister of Alfred d'Orsay) in 1818; they had a son Agénor (later 10th Duke) in the following year. The Duke died in Paris on 3 March 1855, aged 65.

One of his elder sisters, Aglaé-Angélique-Gabrielle (1787-1842) married firstly Count Aleksandr Lvovich Davydov (or Davidoff), who died 1833, and was ancestor of the Marquesses of Gabriac; the Dowager Countess Davidoff married secondly Count Horace Sébastiani de La Porta.

Honours
  Grand officier de la Légion d'honneur
  Chevalier de Saint-Louis
  Grand-croix de St Maurice et St Lazare

Family
He married Anna-Quintina-Albertine Grimod, Countess d'Orsay (19 June 1802 - 2 January 1882) in Paris on 23 July 1818; they had: 
 Antoine Alfred Agénor, 10th Duc de Gramont (Paris, 14 August 1819 - Paris, 17 January 1880);
 Antoine Philibert Léon Auguste, Duc de Lesparre (Paris, 1 July 1820 - Château de Mauvières, 4 September 1877);
 Antonia Albertine Corisande (12 July 1821 - 5 October 1826);
 Antoine Alfred Annérius Théophile, Comte de Gramont (Paris, 2 June 1823 - Paris, 18 December 1881), married in Paris on 21 November 1848 Louise Cécile Charlotte de Choiseul-Praslin (Paris, 16 June 1828 - Paris, 11 March 1902), and had: 
 Antoine Alfred Armand Xavier Louis, Comte de Gramont (Paris, 21 April 1861 - Savennières, 30 October 1923), married in Savennières on 2 October 1886 Anne Marie Brincard (Paris, 11 July 1868 - Savennières, 6 February 1961), of the Barons Brincard, and had: 
 Antoine Louis Marie Arnaud Sanche, Comte de Gramont, Duc de Coigny by courtesy (Paris, 2 July 1888 - k.i.a. First World War, 3 July 1918), unmarried and without issue.
 Diane Antoinette Corisande Anne Marie Louise de Gramont de Coigny (Le Vignal, 3 October 1889 - Savennières, 30 January 1955), married in Paris on 2 December 1911 (div. in Paris on 25 October 1932) D. Nuno Álvares Pereira de Melo, Duque de Cadaval, Marquês de Ferreira com Tratamento de Sobrinho d'El-Rei, Conde de Tentúgal de Juro e Herdade (Pau, 29 February 1888 - Cantegril, 15 February 1925), and had issue;
 Antonia Armandine Aglaé Ida (Paris, 5 October 1825 - Château de Sambucy, 6 September 1871);
 Antonia Gabrielle Léontine (Paris, 2 March 1829 - Chambourcy, 15 October 1897), unmarried and without issue.

References

1789 births
1855 deaths
Antoine 9
British Army personnel of the Napoleonic Wars
French generals
Grand Officiers of the Légion d'honneur
Dukes of Guiche